In Catholic canon law, a validation of marriage or convalidation of marriage is the validation of a Catholic putative marriage. A putative marriage is one when at least one party to the marriage wrongly believes it to be valid. Validation involves the removal of a canonical impediment, or its dispensation, or the removal of defective consent. However, the children of a putative marriage are legitimate.

Simple convalidation
If the impediment to a marriage is a defective consent by one or both parties, a simple renewal of consent removes the impediment and can effect validation.

When a couple has received a dispensation, the partners may validate the marriage by a simple renewal of consent according to canonical form as a new act of the will. When the impediment had affected only one of the parties and the other was unaware of the impediment, only the one aware of the impediment must renew consent. If the impediment is known to both parties, or the impediment is public, then a public renewal of consent by both parties is required.

Radical sanation

The Pope or a bishop can give a dispensation to an impediment, giving the marriage retroactive validation called radical sanation or sanatio in radice (Latin: "healing in the root").  Some impediments can only be dispensed by the pope, others may be dispensed by the diocesan bishop, while others cannot be dispensed (consanguinity in the direct line or in the second degree of the collateral line).

Sanatio in radice retroactively dispenses the impediment and makes a putative marriage valid from the time the sanatio is granted. The sanatio validates a marriage by reason of a consent formerly given, but ineffective because of an impediment. When the impediment is removed or dispensed, the consent is ipso facto ratified and no renovation is required. In such a case, it is requisite that the consent of both parties to the marriage had not ceased and that their marriage had had the external appearance of a true marriage.

References

Bibliography
Code of Canon Law - Wm. Woestman, Canon Law of the Sacraments for Parish Ministry, Ottawa 2007.

Catholic matrimonial canon law
Marriage in the Catholic Church